Blackwall Reach may refer to:
Blackwall Reach (Western Australia) - a section of the Swan River in Western Australia
Blackwall Reach, a section of the River Thames in London
Blackwall Reach development, a regeneration scheme in East London